Copestylum marginatum is a species of syrphid fly in the family Syrphidae. This species has been observed in Southwestern North America.

References

External links

 

Eristalinae
Articles created by Qbugbot
Insects described in 1829
Taxa named by Thomas Say 
Diptera of North America
Hoverflies of North America